Said Ahmed Said (born 20 April 1993) is a professional footballer who plays as a striker for Greek Super League 2 club Panserraikos. Born in Ghana, he has represented Italy at youth level.

Career

Internazionale
Born in Ghana, Said moved to Italy at a young age. He was a product of Internazionale's youth system. He scored 14 goals for the under-17 team in the 2009–10 season and was also the second-highest goalscorer, behind teammate Fabio Hoxha. On 31 August 2010 Said departed Inter on loan for ChievoVerona's Primavera team, however he only featured 9 times.

Genoa
In August 2011 Said transferred to Genoa. He made his Serie A debut on 1 November 2012, against ACF Fiorentina.

On 2 January 2014 Said was loaned to Monza. He was farmed out to Mantova in Summer 2014.

Olhanense
On 31 August 2015, Said was signed by Olhanense on a temporary deal. Said scored 8 goals in 36 matches at Olhanense in the LigaPro.

Hajduk Split
On 5 July 2016, Said was signed by HNK Hajduk Split. Said made his Hajduk debut on 14 July 2016 in a 2–2 draw against Politehnica Iași at the Emil Alexandrescu Stadium in Romania in the Second Round of the 2016–17 UEFA Europa League qualifying. Said came on as a substitute in the 68th minute and scored the equalising goal in the 94th minute. Said made his 1. HNL debut on 17 July 2016, playing 60 minutes before coming off for Zvonimir Kožulj in a 2–0 win over HNK Cibalia. On 24 August 2017, he missed a penalty against Everton in a Europa League Qualifier.
On 19 August 2018, in the 90th minute of Hajduk's home loss against Gorica, he received a red card and a 4-match suspension after headbutting Gorica's goalkeeper Kristijan Kahlina.

Rio Ave
On 31 January 2019, Said was signed by Rio Ave. After four caps in 2019, the forward was loaned on to Lokeren in Belgium for one year.

References

External links
 

Italian footballers
Genoa C.F.C. players
A.C. Monza players
Mantova 1911 players
S.C. Olhanense players
HNK Hajduk Split players
Rio Ave F.C. players
K.S.C. Lokeren Oost-Vlaanderen players
FC Argeș Pitești players
Panserraikos F.C. players
Liga I players
Serie A players
Serie C players
Croatian Football League players
Primeira Liga players
Belgian Pro League players
Super League Greece 2 players
Italy youth international footballers
Expatriate footballers in Croatia
Expatriate footballers in Portugal
Expatriate footballers in Belgium
Expatriate footballers in Romania
Association football forwards
Italian sportspeople of African descent
Ghanaian emigrants to Italy
Naturalised citizens of Italy
Italian people of Ghanaian descent
1993 births
Living people
Footballers from Kumasi